France Bleu Périgord is one of the public service radio stations of the France Bleu network. It broadcasts in Dordogne and Lot-et-Garonne, though it is accessible to parts of Haute-Vienne on FM. It has its headquarters in Périgueux's regional Departmental Center for Communication, where it has been located since 2004.

History 
The Périgord branch of Radio France opened on 26 October 1982 at 5:45 a.m., under the name . It became "Radio France Périgord" in 1985. At the time, it was only the sixth regional radio station in the network (compared to 44 as of 2022); it only had a single transmitter in Bergerac before being assigned a proper frequency on the Limoges - Les Cars transmitter at some point in 1984. It was folded into the new France Bleu network in 2000.

References 

Radio stations in France
French-language radio stations
1982 establishments in France
Radio stations established in 1982